The Syro-Malabar Catholic Eparchy of Thuckalay-Thiruvithancode is an Eastern Catholic eparchy in India, under the Syro-Malabar Catholic Church in Thuckaly, Kanyakumari District. It was founded on 11 November 1996.

Ordinaries 
George Alencherry (1996 - 2011; became Major Archbishop of Ernakulam-Angamaly)
Mar George Rajendram (2012 - present)

External links
Syro-Malabar Catholic Diocese of Thuckalay

History, Young Church - CNEWA

Eastern Catholic dioceses in India
Syro-Malabar Catholic dioceses
Christian organizations established in 1996
Roman Catholic dioceses and prelatures established in the 20th century
Christianity in Tamil Nadu
1996 establishments in Tamil Nadu